Gouroumbila is a town in the Nanoro Department of Boulkiemdé Province in central western Burkina Faso. It has a population of 661.

References

Populated places in Boulkiemdé Province